The Soldiers', Sailors', Marines', Coast Guard and Airmen's Club was a private social club founded in 1919 and located at 283 Lexington Avenue between East 36th and 37th Streets in the Murray Hill neighborhood of Midtown Manhattan, New York City. It was the only private organization in the New York area accommodating U.S. servicemen and servicewomen at subsidized rates. It also catered to military retirees and veterans and their families.

Mission
According to the club, its mission was:

"To promote the general welfare of men and women of the Armed Forces of the United States and its Allies, and their families, by maintaining and offering club and lodging rooms"

History
In 1919, Cornelia Barnes Rogers and Eleanor Butler Alexander-Roosevelt, wife of Theodore Roosevelt, Jr., along with General John J. Pershing, founded The Soldiers' and Sailors' Club to accommodate servicemen returning from overseas duty in World War I. The Club originally served only active duty enlisted male soldiers and sailors, but it now serves all ranks (officers and enlisted) and services, active and retired, of the United States and its allies. With no U.S. government funding, supported solely by guest proceeds and the donations of private citizens, it has accommodated over 2.5 million men and women of the US military and their families.

Currently, about 15,000 such personnel patronize the facility annually. In recent years the SSMAC Club has tended to incur an annual deficit of around $350,000.

One of the largest fundraisers for the club is the prestigious International Debutante Ball held biannually at the Waldorf-Astoria Hotel in New York City.

The club was closed and sold in 2018.

Facility
Since the early 1920s, the SSMAC Club has occupied two adjacent 19th century townhouses on Lexington Avenue between 36th and 37th Streets. These were built in the 1880s as homes for the upper middle class of that period. It is now a 79-bed facility that includes a library with two Internet stations, two large event rooms (North Lounge, South Lounge; both on the 1st floor), a television room, and a dining room. The walls of both common areas and private rooms are replete with U.S. military memorabilia, especially relating to World War I and World War II. (Private rooms are dedicated to individual veterans, families and other donors having provided pictures, certificates, etc. A small room at the back of the 1st floor memorializes Lt. Col. (Prince) Serge Obolensky.)

See also
 List of American gentlemen's clubs
 New York Military Affairs Symposium

References

External links
The SSMAC Club website in Archive.org

1919 establishments in New York (state)
Clubs and societies in the United States
Veterans' affairs in the United States
Murray Hill, Manhattan
Gentlemen's clubs in the United States
United States military support organizations
Clubs and societies in New York City